Nicolas Béhuchet (1288 – 24 June 1340), also known as Colin Béhuchet, was a French admiral and financier. Together with Hugues Quiéret, he commanded the French fleet during the early phases of the Hundred Years' War. At the battle of Arnemuiden in 1338, Béhuchet ordered the English prisoners massacred. The following years, he and Quiéret fought the English in the Channel. Two years after Arnemuiden, the French fleet was anchored at Sluys in preparation of an invasion of England. The fleet was attacked by Edward III's English fleet and was destroyed in the battle of Sluys. After this defeat, the captured Béhuchet was hanged as a revenge for the massacre at Arnemuiden.

References 

1340 deaths
French Navy admirals
French people executed abroad
People executed by the Kingdom of England by hanging
People executed under the Plantagenets
14th-century executions by England
Executed military personnel
14th-century French people
People of the Hundred Years' War
Executed French people
Year of birth unknown
French financiers
1288 births